Morotai United Football Club (simply known as Morotai United or MU) is an Indonesian football club based in Morotai Island, North Maluku. They currently compete in the Liga 3.

Honours
 Liga 3 North Maluku
 Winner: 2023
 Runner-up: 2021

References

External links

Football clubs in Indonesia
Football clubs in North Maluku
Association football clubs established in 2019
2019 establishments in Indonesia